Anaspidomorphi (anaspidomorphs) is an extinct superclass of jawless fish.

According to the newer taxonomy based on the work of Nelson, Grande and Wilson 2016 and van der Laan 2018, the phylogeny of Anaspidomorphi looks like this:

 Superclass †Anaspidomorphi
 Order †Euphanerida
 Family †Euphaneropidae Woodward 1900
 Order †Jamoytiiformes Halstead-Tarlo 1967
 Family †Achanarellidae Newman 2002
 Family †Jamoytiidae White 1946
 Class †Anaspida Janvier 1996 non Williston 1917
 Order †Endeiolepidiformes Berg 1940
 Family †Endeiolepididae Stensio 1939
 Order †Birkeniiformes Stensiö 1964
 Family †Pharyngolepididae Kiær 1924
 Family †Pterygolepididae Obručhev 1964
 Family †Rhyncholepididae Kiær 1924
 Family †Tahulalepididae Blom, Märss & Miller 2002
 Family †Lasaniidae Goodrich 1909
 Family †Ramsaasalepididae Blom, Märss & Miller 2003
 Family †Birkeniidae Traquair 1899
 Family †Septentrioniidae Blom, Märss & Miller 2002

References

External links 

 Anaspidomorphi at comenius.susqu.edu

 
Superclasses (biology)